Azganin-e Olya (also Romanized as Azganīn-e ‘Olyā; also known as Azganīn-e Bālā, Azganīn, Azgarīn, and Bāla Azgarin) is a village in Rudbar-e Mohammad-e Zamani Rural District, Alamut-e Gharbi District, Qazvin County, Qazvin Province, Iran. At the 2006 census, its population was 69, in 20 families.

References 

Populated places in Qazvin County